Stictopleurus crassicornis is a species of scentless plant bugs belonging to the family Rhopalidae, subfamily Rhopalinae.

Description
These bugs have a punctuated pronotum, a banded connexivum and a rounded or pointed tip of the scutellum. The body is brown and the abdomen is often greenish. In the anterior margin of the pronotum there are two small dark brown markings quite difficult to discern.

Biology
Adults can be found from June to September. These bugs feed on various Asteraceae species.

Distribution
This species is widespread in most of Europe and in Northern Asia (excluding China). The preferred habitats are meadows.

Bibliography
Henry, Thomas J., and Richard C. Froeschner, eds. (1988), Catalog of the Heteroptera, or True Bugs, of Canada and the Continental United States
Göllner-Scheiding, Ursula (1975) Revision der Gattung Stictopleurus Stål, 1872 (Heteroptera, Rhopalidae), Deutsche Entomologische Zeitschrift, n. f., vol. 22, no. 1-3

References

Hemiptera of Europe
Bugs described in 1758
Taxa named by Carl Linnaeus
Rhopalini